This is a list of museums in London, the capital city of England and the United Kingdom. It also includes university and non-profit art galleries. As of 2016, there were over 250 registered art institutions in Greater London.

List of museums in London

Defunct museums

Visitor figures
The Department for Digital, Culture, Media and Sport (DCMS) publishes monthly visitor figures for the public sector museums and galleries which it sponsors, which include most of the leading museums in London.

The most popular London museum in the private sector is The Sherlock Holmes Museum.

The DCMS totals for the financial year to 31 March 2008 were as follows:

NOTE: Tate Modern and Tate Britain are on separate sites two miles apart, but the DCMS only publishes a single combined visitor figure for them. Tate Modern is widely reported to attract the more visitors of the two, but it is not clear whether it received more visitors than the British Museum on its own.

The majority of government-funded museums stopped charging admission fees in 2001 and, although this was challenged in 2007, this has remained the case. Following the removal of admission charges, attendances at London museums increased, with a large percentage of the 42 million annual visitors nationwide.

See also

Albertopolis
Museum Mile, London
The London Museums of Health & Medicine
Culture of London
:Category:Tourist attractions in London

References

External links

London's best unsung museums – Time Out London
New Exhibitions – Exhibition listings; includes comprehensive list of commercial art galleries in London.

London

Museums
London
Museums
London